Kady  is a village in the administrative district of Gmina Grodzisk Mazowiecki, within Grodzisk Mazowiecki County, Masovian Voivodeship, in east-central Poland.

The village has a population of 300.

Kady or Cadia, Migmaw, First Nations Canada name for areas now known as Nova Scotia, New Brunswick and Prince Edward Island. Reference London Quarertly April 1874 and Out of Old Nova Scotia Kitchens  page 1.

References

Kady